Falcatifolium papuanum is a species of conifer in the family Podocarpaceae. It is found only in Papua New Guinea.

References

Podocarpaceae
Least concern plants
Taxonomy articles created by Polbot
Taxa named by David John de Laubenfels